Sara O'Leary is a Canadian writer. She has published fiction, children's books, plays, and reviews. She holds an MA in English and Creative Writing from Concordia University in Montreal and an MFA with a specialization in Screenwriting from the Program in Theatre, Film and Creative Writing at the University of British Columbia. Her picture book, This is Sadie, was adapted for the stage by Barbara Zinn Krieger for New York City Children's Theater. The production, directed and choreographed by Stephanie Klemons, was deemed "beguiling" by the New York Times.  O'Leary also blogs about children's literature at 123oleary. She currently teaches at Concordia University.

Children's books
 Owls Are Good at Keeping Secrets, illustrated by Jacob Grant (Random House/Tundra, 2018)
 The Boy and the Blue Moon, illustrated by Ashley Crowley (Godwin Books, Henry Holt, 2018)
 A Family Is a Family Is a Family, illustrated by Qin Leng (Groundwood Books, 2016)
 You Are One/Two/Three, illustrated by Karen Klassen (Owl Kids, 2016/17)
 This Is Sadie, illustrated by Julie Morstad (Tundra Books, 2015)
 When I Was Small, illustrated by Julie Morstad (Simply Read Books, 2011)
 Where You Came From, illustrated by Julie Morstad (Simply Read Books, 2008)
 When You Were Small, illustrated by Julie Morstad (Simply Read Books, 2006)

Plays
O'Leary's plays have been performed at numerous Fringe festivals and an early play, "The Dysfunctional Documentary," was nominated for a Sterling Drama Prize. Her play, "The Kitchen Sink," took first prize in Theatre BC's National Playwriting Competition for 2003 and was subsequently produced by Frank Moher at Western Edge Theatre.

Fiction and reviews
A collection of postcard stories titled Wish You Were Here  was published by Exile Editions (1994) and followed up by a collection of short fiction titled Comfort Me With Apples (Thistledown, 1998).  O'Leary then went on to become  a weekly literary columnist for both the Vancouver Sun and CBC Radio One. Her fiction has appeared in publications such as Mslexia Hobart, and The Walrus and her reviews appear in The Globe and Mail and The National Post. She is currently at work on a story collection titled The Art of Losing. On July 7, 2020, O'Leary published a novel entitled The Ghost in the House.

References

Living people
Canadian children's writers
Canadian women novelists
Canadian women children's writers
Canadian women short story writers
21st-century Canadian short story writers
21st-century Canadian women writers
Year of birth missing (living people)